Lundeberg is a Swedish surname that may refer to
Åke Lundeberg (1888–1939), Swedish sports shooter 
Christian Lundeberg (1842–1911), Swedish politician 
Harry Lundeberg (1901–1957), American merchant seaman and labor leader
Helen Lundeberg (1908–1999), American painter
Philip K. Lundeberg (born 1923), American naval historian

See also
Lundeberg Derby Monument

Swedish-language surnames